The State Street Halloween Party, renamed Freakfest in 2006, is an annual city-sponsored Halloween festival in Madison, Wisconsin. It is considered the largest Halloween festival in the Midwest. 

Freakfest is a gathering place for tens of thousands of party-goers, many dressed in Halloween costumes. Most attendees are students from the University of Wisconsin–Madison and their guests, but others come from across Wisconsin and elsewhere. Before the city began charging admission, the festival saw crowds of up to 100,000 and a plethora of riotous behavior; but in recent years the crowds have been a fraction that size and have remained largely peaceful.

The festival was cancelled in 2020 due to concerns related to the COVID-19 pandemic, and again in 2021 for the same reason. In 2022, Madison's Central Business Improvement District announced that Freakfest would again be cancelled, citing difficulties in funding and support. District 4 alderman Michael Verveer stated, "There's a good chance as of now that we've ended the Freakfest chapter of a long State Street Halloween history".

History
In 1977, a group of UW Madison students started a block party on Halloween night. As it would come to be known, the State Street Halloween Party consisted of thousands of costumed partygoers packing the streets and consuming alcohol. The student government began to sponsor the event as a fundraiser in 1979. However, when the legal drinking age changed in 1986, the fundraising ceased as their primary money-making source was gone, leading to the eventual end of student government's sponsorship. From 1989 until the late 1990s, crowd size varied.

By the 2000s, the event's size grew significantly and largely culminated in rioting resulting in vandalism, theft, property damage, arson, and assault; resulting in hundreds of arrests costing the city of Madison thousands of dollars. By 2003, the event became a point of contention in local government and was costing the city over $700,000. The cost of additional police, the potential of damage to local businesses, and the protection of the city's reputation prompted the concern of Madison leaders, some of whom suggested canceling the event altogether. In 2005, riot police used tear gas to disperse the riotous crowd of 100,000 and over 400 arrests occurred.

In the summer of 2006, Mayor Dave Cieslewicz unveiled the city's plan for the upcoming Halloween events. The plan at its core consisted of blocking off State Street, charging five dollars for admission from select points of entry, and closing off the street at midnight. As a result, the riotous behavior ceased as the event became a largely peaceful city sanctioned festival.

In 2006, the city government officially named the event "Freakfest." The festival includes films and live performances by nationally known musical artists and in recent years has been sponsored by Mountain Dew. Alcohol possession and consumption on the street are prohibited but local bars and restaurants serve Freakfest attendees.

Attendance and arrest rates

*2012-2019 data is tickets sold.

References

Culture of Madison, Wisconsin
Festivals in Wisconsin
Festivals established in 1979
Halloween events in the United States
Tourist attractions in Madison, Wisconsin
1979 establishments in Wisconsin